Ang Darling Kong Aswang (lit. "My Aswang Darling"), also known as Ang Darling Kong Asawa, is a 2009 Filipino comedy horror film.

Plot
Victor (Vic Sotto) is a single father who falls in love with Elisa (Cristine Reyes) who turns out to be an Aswang. But even so, Victor loved Elisa so much that he accepted who she is and even live with her as his second wife.

But the problem comes when the leader of the Aswang clan (Jean Garcia) finds out that Elisa and her mother (Agot Isidro) are not eating humans anymore. She sends out other Aswangs to hunt down Elisa and her mother, and also for Victor and his family.

Victor then will face the leader of the Aswang clan to save his beloved Elisa.

Cast
Vic Sotto as Victor Lagman
Cristine Reyes as Eliza Santos
Jean Garcia as Barang
Agot Isidro as Ida
Dante Rivero as Do
Denise Laurel as Beta
Jackie Rice as Alpha
Empress Schuck as Keka
Richie D'Horsie as Tom
Rafael Rosell as Joaquin
Mika Dela Cruz as Angel Lagman
Barbie Forteza as Aileen Lagman
Wally Bayola as Jerry
Joonee Gamboa as Father Anton
Luz Fernandez as Simang
Gian Sotto as Gino 
Sam Y.G. as Mr. Singh 
Jenny Miller as Mrs. Singh
Allan K. as Pasiyonista
Shalala as Shalala
Petite as Pasiyonista 1
Tita Swarding as Gay in the bible study
Joey de Leon as Mang Pekweng or Mang Pek (an Albularyo)
Mosang as Bebang
Oyo Sotto as Policeman/Dj Midnight
Jacky Woo as Cameraman
Pia Guanio as Aip
Rufa Mi as Applicant
Nonong de Andres aka Bangkay as Banong
Jeremiah Sird as Tambaloslos

Awards and nominations

See also
 List of ghost films

Trivia
Same as Fantastic Man, a sequel was intended to be planned, but did not.
It is a remake of the 1975 movie " Ang Darling ko'y Aswang"

Production

Box office

References

External links
 

2009 films
Philippine comedy horror films
Mosang films
OctoArts Films films
APT Entertainment films
M-Zet Productions films
2009 comedy horror films
2009 comedy films
Films directed by Tony Y. Reyes
Filipino-language films